Jo Jackson may refer to:

Joanne Jackson (swimmer) (born 1986), English swimmer and Olympic medallist for Great Britain
Johanna Jackson (born 1985), British racewalking athlete

See also
Joe Jackson (disambiguation)